Vatanspor is an association football club based in Brabrand, Aarhus Denmark, that competes in the Jutland Series, the sixth tier of the Danish football league system. 

Founded in 1989, the club is affiliated to DBU Jutland, the regional football association. The team plays its home matches at Arena Vest Kunstgræsbane. The club was founded by Turkish immigrants and has advanced through the league system, currently playing in the sixth highest Danish league, Jutland Series, after having spent some seasons in Denmark Series, the fourth division.

History
Vatanspor was founded by Mustafa Pelit, current chairman of the club, and a group of other young men with a Turkish background on Lottesvej 12, Brabrand in 1989. The intention of forming the club was keeping troubled youths away from the streets and at the same time uniting young people with an immigrant background in one team.

In June 2011, in a Series 1 match against local rivals from Lystrup IF, a supporter from Vatanspor spat the match official in his face after the match, which had seen some questionable refereeing decisions. As a result, the club was suspended by the Danish Football Union (DBU) in both league– and cup matches, a decision which was since overturned after a dialogue between all parties. Vatanspor was, however, required to hire guards on matchdays.

As of 2020, Vatanspor has five teams represented in the regional tiers of DBU Jutland, with its first team competing in the Jutland Series. In 2016, the club reached the Denmark Series, the fourth highest tier in Danish football, for the first time in its history after beating SSV Højfyn in play-offs. Thereby, Vatanspor became the only second immigrant club in Danish football history to reach that level after FK Prespa, a Copenhagen-based club with Macedonian roots achieved this feat in 1999.

Vatanspor has around 100 members and has been represented by people with Danish, Turkish, Iranian, Iraqi, Sudanese, Somali, American, Faroese, Bosnian, Lebanese, Palestinian and Kurdish background.

On 1 September 2022, Vatanspor faced Danish Superliga club AGF in the Danish Cup. The match was the focus of a political debate, as AGF had served kebab on Aarhus Stadium to accommodate the mainly Muslim fans of Vatanspor, a club founded by Turkish immigrants. This meant that right-wing Danish People's Party co-founder Pia Kjærsgaard attended the match.

References

External links
 Official site

1989 establishments in Denmark
Association football clubs established in 1989
Sport in Aarhus
Football clubs in Denmark
Turkish association football clubs outside Turkey